Mosquito Squadron is a 1969 British war film made by Oakmont Productions, directed by Boris Sagal and starring David McCallum.  The raid echoes Operation Jericho, a combined RAF–Maquis raid which freed French prisoners from Amiens jail in which the Mosquitos took part.

Plot
The Royal Air Force (RAF) begins attacking German V-1 flying bomb installations in early summer of 1944.  The de Havilland Mosquito fighter-bomber aircraft of Squadron Leader David "Scotty" Scott (David Buck) is shot down during a low-level bombing raid on a V-1 launching site. Scott and his navigator/bomb-aimer are killed. Following the raid, his wingman and friend, then-Flight Lieutenant (later insignia Royal Canadian Air Force squadron leader) Quint Munroe (David McCallum) comforts Scott's wife, Beth (Suzanne Neve), and a romance soon develops, rekindling one that they had had years earlier.

After nearly losing his own life on a photographic reconnaissance mission over the Château de Charlon in Northern France, Munroe, under orders from Air Commodore Hufford (Charles Gray), is tasked to lead an attack against the château using a Barnes Wallis-type land-use "bouncing bomb" (referred to as Highball). Following the reported capture and assumed torture by the Gestapo of a French Maquis resistance fighter, Allied prisoners, including a very-much-alive Scott and other shot-down RAF airmen, are held as "human shields" to thwart a raid. This is seen in a disturbing film dropped by a Luftwaffe Messerschmitt Bf 109 fighter that, in tandem with others, bombed and strafed the airfield, killing a number of RAF personnel.

The Royal Air Force target is a tunnel leading to an underground Nazi factory on the château grounds, where new "V-3" long-range, multi-stage rockets are being constructed. The prisoners are held in the chapel during Sunday morning mass to concentrate them in one location. This is part of a coordinated attack that will allow French Maquis resistance fighters to get them out, once a Mosquito has used a Highball bomb to blow a hole in the outer wall closest to the chapel. But not before Father Belaguere (Michael Anthony), a Catholic priest and Maquis agent, is killed by an enraged German army officer, Leutnant Schack (Vladek Sheybal), for refusing to order the airmen back to their cells. The prisoners disarm Schack, pushing him outside, and stay holed-up inside when the RAF begins the raid.

Munroe and Bannister drop their first two Highballs, but both miss. After wingman Clark is shot down by a Bf 109, they have just two left for two targets. Bannister is shot down by flak and crashes into the tunnel, his bombs exploding, leading to the destruction of the factory. Munroe blows apart the prison wall, just as the Germans are about to breech the chapel door and machine-gun all their prisoners. This allows most of the airmen to escape. The senior RAF officer, Squadron Leader Neale (Bryan Marshall), is killed by German machine-pistol fire during the prisoner breakout. With the help of the resistance fighters, his comrades make their way out of the château and its grounds. The bombing raid continues with a second wave of Mosquitos dropping conventional bombs that obliterate the château buildings.

Munroe and Scott are briefly reunited after Munroe's Mosquito is brought down by flak. Scott, still suffering from amnesia and unable to remember his name (he sports a chalked "X" on his uniform for identification), rebuffs Munroe's attempt to get him to remember, ignoring a mention of his wife's name. Scott later sacrifices himself to stop a German tank with a captured Panzershreck. He saves Munroe and others but is too late to save Flight Sergeant Wiley Bunce (Nicky Henson), Munroe's navigator.

The next day, after rescue by submarine, Munroe, along with other survivors of the raid, is repatriated back to his RAF airbase in one of two Avro Anson transport aircraft. After being congratulated by his commanding officer, Wing Commander Penrose (Dinsdale Landen), as well as Air Commodore Hufford, he is reunited with Beth and her brother, Flight Lieutenant Douglas Shelton (David Dundas). Shelton is an ex-pilot who lost his right hand in combat. He sports a hook in its place and now serves in the same squadron in charge of training. He conceals from her that her husband survived and was captured (both he and Shelton had, in fact, discovered that her husband had not been killed, thanks to the dropped German film).

Cast

Production
Although not a sequel, the film is similar to the 1964 film 633 Squadron and was influenced by it, even using some of its footage. The pre-title sequence (including the aforementioned opening music by Frank Cordell) was also taken from the WWII film Operation Crossbow. Bovingdon Airfield in Hertfordshire was a location for many scenes; four "flightworthy" de Havilland Mosquito aircraft, including RR299, which eventually crashed and much later was destroyed in July 1996, were based at the airfield. The "chateau" used is actually Minley Manor, near Farnborough in Hampshire, Southern England.

The Highball weapon featured was an actual development of Barnes Wallis's "dam-busting" Upkeep bomb, and the footage of Mosquitoes dropping Highballs on land is genuine WWII archive footage, although in the event Highball was never used in combat. Charles Gray's character mentions Barnes Wallis during his briefing, in such a way as to erroneously imply that the name was well known to the RAF personnel (Wallis was not publicly identified as the Upkeep inventor until after the War). The special Highball bombsight is also a genuine representation of the one used in combat.

The car driven by David McCallum is a 1935 Godsal V8 Corsica.

Soundtrack
The film features a memorable music score (starting with pounding bass drum beats to background the V-1 flying-bomb scenes) composed and conducted by Frank Cordell. Cordell's score was intended as a soundtrack album from United Artists Records that was never released until Film Score Monthly finally issued it on CD, paired with Cordell's score for Khartoum.

Reception
Most reviewers concentrated on the low-budget production values, but the script and cast also received severe criticism from some quarters. In 1968, McCallum, attending a film festival in Nice, was quoted, “I’ve seen bongo films better than that Mosquito rubbish”.

References

Notes

Citations

Bibliography

 "De Havilland Mosquito, De Speelfilms (in Dutch)."
 Lindsey, Brian. "Mosquito Squadron." Eccentric Cinema. Retrieved: 20 February 2011.

External links 
 
 Mosquito Squadron review

1969 films
1960s English-language films
1969 war films
British war drama films
British aviation films
World War II aviation films
British World War II films
Films directed by Boris Sagal
United Artists films
Royal Air Force mass media
Films shot at MGM-British Studios
World War II films based on actual events
1960s British films